Aythya is a genus of diving ducks. It has twelve described species. The name Aythya comes from the Ancient Greek word , which may have referred to a sea-dwelling duck or an auklet.

Aythya shihuibas was described from the Late Miocene of China. Zelenkov (2016) transferred the species Anas denesi Kessler (2013), known from the late Miocene of Hungary, to the genus Aythya. An undescribed prehistoric species is known only from Early Pleistocene fossil remains found at Dursunlu, Turkey; it might however be referrable to a paleosubspecies of an extant species considering its age (see also Greater scaup).

The Miocene "Aythya" arvernensis is now placed in Mionetta, while "Aythya" chauvirae seems to contain the remains of two species, at least one of which does not seem to be a diving duck.

The genus Aythya was introduced in 1822 by the German zoologist Friedrich Boie. The type species is the greater scaup.

Aythya species
The genus contains 12 species.

Phylogeny
Based on the Taxonomy in Flux from John Boyd's website.

See also
 Late Quaternary prehistoric birds
 List of fossil bird genera

Gallery

References

 
Diving ducks
Bird genera
Taxa named by Friedrich Boie